The 2009 Shizuoka earthquake occurred with a magnitude of 6.4, hitting Shizuoka Prefecture in the south of Honshū, Japan, on August 11 at 05:07 local time (August 10, 20:07 UTC).

Overview
The seismic intensity was observed as shindo 6- in Izu, Yaizu, Makinohara, Omaezaki, Shizuoka.

One woman was killed in Shizuoka, 134 people were injured, and 6,000 buildings were damaged. In addition, the shoulder of Tōmei Expressway was damaged.

In this area, it is presumed that an M8 class Tokai earthquake will occur in the near future.

See also
 Earthquake Early Warning (Japan)
 Fault (geology)
 List of earthquakes in 2009
 List of earthquakes in Japan
 Yoshinobu Ishikawa

References

External links
 M6.2 - near the south coast of Honshu, Japan - United States Geological Survey
 気象庁 | 平成21年（2009年）8月11日の駿河湾の地震 - Japan Meteorological Agency
 

Shizuoka
Earthquakes of the Heisei period
August 2009 events in Japan
2009 in Japan
2009 disasters in Japan